

2011 Angola Men's Basketball Cup

The 2011 Men's Basketball Cup was contested by 12 teams. Recreativo do Libolo, beat Petro Atlético in the best of three games finals, to win its second straight cup title.

2011 Angola Women's Basketball Cup

The 2011 Women's Basketball Cup was contested by four teams, with Interclube and Maculusso, playing for the title, at the best of three games, on November 10 and 12 2010, with Interclube winning the title by beating Maculusso 86-35 and 75-41.

See also
 2010 Angola Basketball Super Cup
 2010 BAI Basket
 2010 Victorino Cunha Cup

References

Angola Basketball Cup seasons
Cup